Dorothea "Dolly" de Ficquelmont (Daria Fyodorovna Fikelmon; 14 October 1804, Saint Petersburg, Russian Empire10 April 1863, Venice, Austrian Empire), born Countess Dorothea von Tiesenhausen, was a Russian writer and salonist. A granddaughter of the Russian war hero General Prince Kutuzov (who distinguished himself in the Napoleonic Wars), she was a Russian aristocrat of German Baltic origin, and later a member of the Austrian nobility as the wife of Count Karl Ludwig von Ficquelmont.

Biography

Dolly von Tiesenhausen was the daughter of Count Ferdinand von Tiesenhausen, aide-de-camp of Emperor Alexandre I of Russia who died at Austerlitz, and of Princess Elisabeth "Lisa" (sometimes "Elisa") Koutouzova, daughter of Prince Kutuzov. Her mother remarried in 1811 to Count Nicolas Khitrovo, Russian special envoy to the Grand Duchy of Tuscany. From 1815, Dolly von Tiesenhausen spent her childhood with her mother and her sister Catherine — future lady-in-waiting of the Imperial Court of Russia — in Reval, then moved to Florence where she spent the rest of her youth.

On 3 June 1821 she married Count Charles-Louis de Ficquelmont, Austrian Ambassador before the Habsbourgs-Tuscany, who was 27 years her senior. Following their marriage, the Count was appointed Ambassador to the Court of King Ferdinand I of Two Sicilies in Naples. In spite of the revolutionary troubles in the Kingdom of Two Sicilies and the increasing tensions between Austria and Naples, the Ficquelmonts perfectly integrated into Naples' aristocratic high society.

In 1823, the Ficquelmonts travelled to Saint Petersburg. Emperor Alexander offered her mother, Princess Khitrova, an imperial pension and the family was often seen at Court.

Back in Naples in 1825, Dolly gave birth to her only daughter, Elisabeth-Alexandrine-Marie-Theresa de Ficquelmont, Princess Clary und Aldringen by marriage.

In 1829, Dolly's husband was appointed Austrian Ambassador in Russia. The Saltykov Mansion was rented by the Austrian Government as the Austrian Embassy. Dolly's mother, Elisabeth Khitrovo had her own apartments in the palace and held a salon. Countess Ficquelmont, who took great interest in literature, philosophy, religion and politics, also held her own salon. Alexander Turgenev, Viazemski or Ivan Kozlov were regulars of the countess's salon. Alexander Pushkin was often seen in Ficquelmont's salon which was described by Prince Wiazemsky as "a place of wisdom and intelligence".

In 1839 her husband was recalled to Vienna to assume the duties of the Foreign Office, so the Ficquelmonts left Russia. During her remaining years, Dolly essentially lived between their palaces of Vienna and Venice and their daughter's castle in Teplice.

Her husband, Count de Ficquelmont became Minister-President of the Empire during the 1848's revolutionary troubles. But, close ally of Russia, he was accused of supporting the Russian repression. The Countess, who was at their Venice's Palace at the time, was arrested twice by the Venetian guarda civil and finally had to leave the city on board an English ship with her daughter, son-in-law and grandchildren.

The family eventually returned to Venice after the Revolution ended and Count de Ficquelmont died in their Venetian Palace in 1857.

After her husband's death, Dolly continued writing her correspondence and organized it in order to publish it. It is mostly made up of philosophy and political thoughts. She also wrote a Journal in French that was published in 1950 in Italian and Russian. The St. Petersburg's period had been closely studied by historian Antony Florovski (1884–1968).

Countess Dolly de Ficquelmont is buried in Princess Clary und Aldringen's family chapel in Dubí, near Teplice.

In fiction 
Countess de Ficquelmont met Alexander Pushkin during fall 1829 and often invited him to her Saint Petersburg Palace. They became friends. Ficquelmont's palace is believed to be the frame for the old Countess' palace in Pushkin's story The Queen of Spades.

See also 
Family von Tiesenhausen
Family de Ficquelmont

Notes

Sources 

 Фикельмон, Дарья Федоровна
М. И. Гиллельсон. Пушкин в итальянском издании дневника Д. Ф. Фикельмон

1804 births
1863 deaths
Women writers from the Russian Empire
Writers from the Russian Empire
Memoirists from the Russian Empire
Socialites from the Russian Empire
Baltic German people from the Russian Empire
Diarists from the Russian Empire
Letter writers from the Russian Empire
Salon holders from the Russian Empire
Women letter writers
Women diarists
19th-century diarists